Otniel is an Orthodox Israeli settlement in the West Bank. Located in the southern Judaean Mountains, south of Hebron, it falls under the jurisdiction of Har Hevron Regional Council.

The international community considers Israeli settlements in the West Bank illegal under international law, but the Israeli government disputes this.

History
The settlement was established in 1983 south of Beit Hagai and north of Shim'a and the Palestinian villages of as-Samu, Yatta and ad-Dhahiriya. The settlement is named after the Biblical judge Otniel Ben Knaz.

Status under international law
The international community considers all Israeli settlements in the West Bank to violate the Fourth Geneva Convention's prohibition on the transfer of an occupying power's civilian population into occupied territory. Israel disputes that the Fourth Geneva Convention applies to the Palestinian territories as they had not been legally held by a sovereign prior to Israel taking control of them. This view has been rejected by the International Court of Justice and the International Committee of the Red Cross.

Arab-Israeli conflict
In December 2002, four students were killed and ten were wounded by Palestinian gunmen in a shooting attack on the yeshiva.

In November 2011, an Otniel resident, Rabbi Dan Mertzbach, was killed, and two women were wounded, when an Israel Defense Forces patrol, on alert for suspected militants, fired on their car as they drove to the Cave of the Patriarchs to pray in the early hours of the morning.

In January 2016, a Palestinian entered the home of a woman and stabbed her to death in front of her three children.

In July 2016, Michael Marc, a resident of Otniel, was killed and members of his family wounded in a drive-by shooting at Adorayim junction near Otniel and Hevron. The shooter, Muhammad Faqih (aged 29) from Dura, was later arrested. .

Notable residents
Yehuda Glick (b. 1965), rabbi and activist
Yakov Nagen (b. 1967), rabbi and activist

Notable people
Re'em Ha'Cohen (b. 1957), Rabbi of Otniel

References

External links

Website of the Hesder Yeshiva in Otniel

Religious Israeli settlements
Populated places established in 1983
1983 establishments in the Palestinian territories
Community settlements
Israeli settlements in the West Bank